Preston Township is an inactive township in Platte County, in the U.S. state of Missouri.

Preston Township was erected in 1838, taking its name from Preston Dunlap, a local judge.

References

Townships in Missouri
Townships in Platte County, Missouri